The 18th General Assembly of Prince Edward Island represented the colony of Prince Edward Island between March 5, 1850, and 1854.

The Assembly sat at the pleasure of the Governor of Prince Edward Island, Donald Campbell.  Alexander Rae was elected speaker.

Responsible government was granted to the island in 1851 and George Coles became the first Premier.

Members

The members of the Prince Edward Island Legislature after the general election of 1850 were:

External links 
 Journal of the House of Assembly of Prince Edward Island (1850)

Terms of the General Assembly of Prince Edward Island
1850 establishments in Prince Edward Island
1854 disestablishments in Prince Edward Island